The 2022 Major League Soccer season was the 27th season of Major League Soccer (MLS), the top professional soccer league in the United States and Canada. The league had 28 clubs following the addition of Charlotte FC as an expansion team.

The regular season began on February 26 and concluded on October 9. The MLS Cup Final occurred on November 5, fifteen days prior to the start of the 2022 FIFA World Cup. New York City FC entered the season as defending champions, having defeated the Portland Timbers in MLS Cup 2021, while the New England Revolution entered the season as the reigning Supporters' Shield winners. Western Conference regular season and playoff champions, Los Angeles FC won their second Supporters' Shield and their first MLS Cup, defeating the Eastern Conference regular season and playoff champions, the Philadelphia Union, in a penalty shoot-out.

A total of 476 matches were played over the course of the regular season and drew an average attendance of 21,033. Total attendance reached a record 10 million, but most teams in the league saw a decline in attendance since the 2019 season. In addition, this was the first season where all stadiums were open to full capacity since the 2019 season.

Teams

Stadiums and locations

Personnel and sponsorships

Coaching changes

Regular season

Format
Each team played 34 matches, including 17 home games and 17 away games.

 All teams played every Conference opponent twice – home and away, plus eight cross-conference games against different opponents within the regular season.

Conference standings

Eastern Conference

Western Conference

Overall table
The leading team in this table wins the Supporters' Shield.

Results

MLS All-Star Game

Playoffs

Bracket

Player statistics

Goals

Hat-tricks 

Notes
(H) – Home team(A) – Away team
4 Scored 4 goals

Assists

Clean sheets

Awards

Team/Player of the Week
Bold denotes League Player of the Week.

Goal of the Week

Player of the Month

End-of-season awards

MLS Best XI

References

External links
 

 
Major League Soccer
Major League Soccer
Major League Soccer seasons